Debtor-in-possession financing or DIP financing is a special form of financing provided for companies in financial distress, typically during restructuring under corporate bankruptcy law (such as Chapter 11 bankruptcy in the US or CCAA in Canada). Usually, this debt is considered senior to all other debt, equity, and any other securities issued by a company — violating any absolute priority rule by placing the new financing ahead of a company's existing debts for payment.

DIP financing may be used to keep a business operating until it can be sold as a going concern, if this is likely to provide a greater return to creditors than the firm's closure and a liquidation of assets. It may also give a troubled company a new start, albeit under strict conditions. In this case, "debtor in possession" financing refers to debt incurred while in bankruptcy, and "exit financing" is debt incurred upon emerging from reorganisation under bankruptcy law.

Examples
Two notable examples are the government financing of Chrysler and General Motors during their respective 2009 bankruptcies.

American law vs. French law
The willingness of governments to allow lenders to place debtor-in-possession financing claims ahead of an insolvent company's existing debt varies; US bankruptcy law expressly allows this while French law had long treated the practice as soutien abusif, requiring employees and state interests be paid first even if the end result was liquidation instead of corporate restructuring.

See also

Debtor in possession
Bankruptcy
Bankruptcy alternatives
Shareholder loan
Seniority (financial)
Bail out (finance)
Default
Distressed securities
Insolvency
Liquidation

References

External links
Calpine closes $5 billion DIP financing
Bankruptcy basics - Operating capital
11 USC 364 - Obtaining credit
Federal Rules of Bankruptcy Procedure - Rule 4001c: Obtaining Credit

Business terms
Corporate finance
United States bankruptcy law